Andrey Aleksandrovich Grigoryev (1883-1968) was a Soviet and Russian geographer and geomorphologist. He proposed the creation of the Department for the Industrial Geographical Study of Russia (DIGS) of the Commission for the Study of the Natural Productive Forces, which occurred in 1918.

Grigoryev graduated as a zoologist from the Department of Physics and Mathematics of St. Petersburg University in 1907.

References

1883 births
1968 deaths
People from Pushkin, Saint Petersburg
Academic staff of Saint Petersburg State University
Stalin Prize winners
Recipients of the Order of Lenin
Recipients of the Order of the Red Banner of Labour
Russian geographers
Soviet geographers
Burials at Novodevichy Cemetery